Sudipen , officially the Municipality of Sudipen, is a 4th class municipality in the province of La Union, Philippines. According to the 2020 census, it has a population of 17,187 people.

Geography
It is bounded on the west by the municipalities of Bangar and Balaoan; on the east and north by the Amburayan River and the province of Ilocos Sur; and in the south by Santol.

Sudipen has a total land area of 97 square kilometers, making it the fifth largest municipality by land area in the province.

Barangays
Sudipen is politically subdivided into 17 barangays. These barangays are headed by elected officials: Barangay Captain, Barangay Council, whose members are called Barangay Councilors. All are elected every three years.

 Bigbiga
 Bulalaan
 Castro
 Duplas
 Ilocano
 Ipet
 Maliclico
 Namaltugan
 Old Central ('Nagpanaoan'')
 Poblacion
 Porporiket
 San Francisco Norte
 San Francisco Sur
 San Jose
 Sengngat
 Turod
 Up-uplas

Climate

Demographics

Economy

Government
Sudipen, belonging to the first congressional district of the province of La Union, is governed by a mayor designated as its local chief executive and by a municipal council as its legislative body in accordance with the Local Government Code. The mayor, vice mayor, and the councilors are elected directly by the people through an election which is being held every three years.

Elected officials

Gallery

References

External links

 [ Philippine Standard Geographic Code]
 Philippine Census Information
 Local Governance Performance Management System

Municipalities of La Union